Abington Township is located in Mercer County, Illinois. As of the 2010 census, its population was 392 and it contained 175 housing units.

Geography 

Demographics

References

External links 
 City-data.com
 Illinois State Archives

Townships in Mercer County, Illinois
Townships in Illinois